Ela Stein-Weissberger (30 June 1930 – 30 March 2018) was a Czech holocaust survivor who became well known for her roles as a contemporary witness and intelligence officer for the Israel Defense Forces. In her later years she traveled the world discussing her time in concentration camps during World War II. She even wrote about her experiences in a book titled The Cat with the Yellow Star: Coming of Age in Terezin.

Stein-Weissberger was deported to Theresienstadt Ghetto when she was 11 with her mother, grandmother, uncle and sister. While there she played the role of the cat in Brundibár, a children's opera, inside the camp. She was featured in the Nazi Propaganda film Theresienstadt. She, her mother, and sister were released from the camp after Nazi Germany fell to the Allies. Her grandmother and uncle died while at the camp.

After being liberated they moved to Prague Stein-Weissberger stayed for a short period of time before moving to Israel and settling near Tel Aviv. Where she lived and worked for several years as a member of the Israeli Army. She gave birth to a daughter and in 1959 the family moved to the United States. She worked as a graphic and interior designer in New York for most of the 1970s and 80s  before beginning to travel the U.S. and telling her experiences from the war.

See also 

 List of Holocaust survivors
 List of victims of Nazism

Bibliography 

 The Cat with the Yellow Star: Coming of Age in Terezin

References

External links 

 
 Ela Stein-Weissberger at Holocaust Memorial Center

1930 births
2018 deaths
Czechoslovak emigrants to Israel
Theresienstadt Ghetto survivors
Czech Jews
Czech women writers